Voodoo Castle  is a text adventure game written by Scott Adams and his wife Alexis. Published by Adventure International in 1979, it is #4 in the Scott Adams Adventure series.

Gameplay

Gameplay involves moving from location to location, picking up any objects found there, and using them somewhere else to unlock puzzles. Commands take the form of verb and noun, e.g. "Climb Tree". Movement from location to location is limited to North, South, East, West, Up, and Down.

The goal is to wake up the Count Dracula-esque Count Cristo, who is lying in a coffin at the starting location in the game. In order to do so, the player needs to obtain certain items, which requires overcoming certain obstacles, such as an exploding test tubes and a doorway that's too small to pass through normally.

External links
 A Memorial to AI Games including solution

1979 video games
1970s horror video games
Adventure games
Adventure International games
Apple II games
Atari 8-bit family games
BBC Micro and Acorn Electron games
Commodore 64 games
VIC-20 games
Dragon 32 games
TRS-80 games
Video games developed in the United States
Video games set in castles
ZX Spectrum games